Group A of the 2022 FIBA Women's Basketball World Cup took place from 22 to 27 September 2022. The group consisted of Belgium, Bosnia and Herzegovina, China, Puerto Rico, South Korea, and the United States.

The top four teams advanced to the quarterfinals.

Teams
Puerto Rico replaced Russia, who were expelled.

Standings

Games
All times are local (UTC+10).

Bosnia and Herzegovina vs Puerto Rico

United States vs Belgium

South Korea vs China

Puerto Rico vs United States

Belgium vs South Korea

China vs Bosnia and Herzegovina

United States vs China

Bosnia and Herzegovina vs South Korea

Puerto Rico vs Belgium

Belgium vs Bosnia and Herzegovina

South Korea vs United States

China vs Puerto Rico

Puerto Rico vs South Korea

China vs Belgium

United States vs Bosnia and Herzegovina

References

Group A